Statistics of Empress's Cup in the 2015 season.

Overview
It was contested by 48 teams, and INAC Kobe Leonessa won the championship.

Results

1st round
Diosa Izumo FC 0-4 Fujieda Junshin High School
Waseda University 1-0 Fukuoka J. Anclas
Niigata University of Health and Welfare 1-2 NGU Nagoya FC
Kanto Gakuen University 0-5 Osaka University of Health and Sport Sciences
Urawa Reds Youth 0-0 (pen 5-4) JFA Academy Fukushima
Chinzei Gakuin High School 2-3 Nippon TV Menina
Kamimura Gakuen High School 3-0 Clubfields Linda
Sfida Setagaya FC 9-0 Seiwa Gakuen High School
Japan Soccer College 1-0 Tokoha University Tachibana High School
Daito Bunka University 2-0 Norddea Hokkaido
Tokiwagi Gakuken High School 0-1 Yokohama FC Seagulls
Shizuoka Sangyo University 8-0 Ryukyu Deigos
Shikoku University 0-5 Yamato Sylphid
Kaishi Gakuen Japan Soccer College 0-4 Kibi International University
Hinomoto Gakuen High School 4-3 Tokuyama University
University of Tsukuba 1-1 (pen 3-4) Bunnys Kyoto SC

2nd round
Nippon TV Beleza 3-1 Fujieda Junshin High School
AS Harima ALBION 2-2 (pen 0-3) Waseda University
Speranza FC Osaka-Takatsuki 6-0 NGU Nagoya FC
Iga FC Kunoichi 3-0 Osaka University of Health and Sport Sciences
Albirex Niigata 5-0 Urawa Reds Youth
Nojima Stella Kanagawa Sagamihara 3-1 Nippon TV Menina
Nippon Sport Science University 5-1 Kamimura Gakuen High School
JEF United Chiba 1-0 Sfida Setagaya FC
Vegalta Sendai 3-0 Japan Soccer College
Ehime FC 2-3 Daito Bunka University
Urawa Reds 5-0 Yokohama FC Seagulls
AC Nagano Parceiro 6-1 Shizuoka Sangyo University
Okayama Yunogo Belle 3-1 Yamato Sylphid
AS Elfen Saitama 2-0 Kibi International University
Angeviolet Hiroshima 2-1 Hinomoto Gakuen High School
INAC Kobe Leonessa 4-0 Bunnys Kyoto SC

3rd round
Nippon TV Beleza 5-0 Waseda University
Speranza FC Osaka-Takatsuki 1-2 Iga FC Kunoichi
Albirex Niigata 2-1 Nojima Stella Kanagawa Sagamihara
Nippon Sport Science University 0-2 JEF United Chiba
Vegalta Sendai 4-1 Daito Bunka University
Urawa Reds 2-0 AC Nagano Parceiro
Okayama Yunogo Belle 2-6 AS Elfen Saitama
Angeviolet Hiroshima 0-5 INAC Kobe Leonessa

Quarterfinals
Nippon TV Beleza 4-1 Iga FC Kunoichi
Albirex Niigata 2-0 JEF United Chiba
Vegalta Sendai 0-0 (pen 5-3) Urawa Reds
AS Elfen Saitama 0-2 INAC Kobe Leonessa

Semifinals
Nippon TV Beleza 1-1 (pen 2-3) Albirex Niigata
Vegalta Sendai 0-2 INAC Kobe Leonessa

Final
INAC Kobe Leonessa 1-0 Albirex Niigata
INAC Kobe Leonessa won the championship.

References

Empress's Cup
2015 in Japanese women's football